The Yorkshire Academy Bobcats are a British American football team based in Leeds, West Yorkshire who play in the BAFA National Leagues at Associate Level. The club was formed as the Leeds Bobcats in 2008 as a youth football team following ties with the Celina Bobcats from Texas. A Bobcats senior team began playing associate Football from 2011 onwards until being granted BAFA status in 2014 in order to debut in the 2015 season. The club has since grown from strength to strength from then onward making it to the playoffs in their second season.

Just before the start of the 2022 season, The Bobcats announced they had resigned their BAFANL spot, and would be demoting themselves to the BAFA Associate programme. Furthermore the club announced they were being absorbed into the programme of their local rivals the Yorkshire Rams, thus becoming the Rams development team.

History

Early history
In 2008 members of the Leeds American Football team youth squad were invited to Texas by the Celina Bobcats, who were the Division Three All Star State Champions, following tuition and guidance to form their own team back in England, the Leeds Bobcats were born. In 2010, the Bobcats Youth team won its first trophy after defeating the Colchester Gladiators in the final of a 5 team tournament. Several members of the Bobcats juniors went on to represent Great Britain at youth level and in 2011 the majority of the team progressed to senior level and the Bobcats became a Senior associate team.

Debut campaign
In 2014, the Bobcats were granted BAFA status in order to debut in the 2015 season. The club were entered into the BAFA NFC South 2 along with the Lincolnshire Bombers, Leicester Falcons, Sandwell Steelers, Humber Warhawks and the Peterborough Saxons. The Bobcats debuted in a 54-0 defeat by Sandwell and would only record two victories over Humber in their first season, although the club heavily improved from a poor start and came close to beating both Peterborough and Leicester.

Recent seasons
In 2017, former Running Back and Special Teams Coach, Miles Stanford replaced Paul Goodward as Head Coach after he vacated the position following a long and successful tenure.

After promotion following the 2017 campaign, the Bobcats spent a single season in BAFA Division 1 North during 2018, culminating in relegation back to Division 2. Fergus O'Neil then took up Head Coaching duties in 2019, leading the Bobcats to BAFA Division 2 North Playoff Quarter Finals, where they were knocked out by Scottish side Clyde Valley Blackhawks.

For the 2020 season, highly experienced player and coach Chris Peel was appointed to the Head Coach position to lead the team in the BAFA NFC 2 East after re-alignment from the NFC 2 Central division.

League resignation and merger
Just before the start of the 2022 season, The Bobcats announced they had resigned their BAFANL spot, and would be demoting themselves to the BAFA Associate programme. Furthermore the club announced they were being absorbed into the programme of their local rivals the Yorkshire Rams, thus becoming the Rams development team.

Home ground
The club is based at West Leeds RUFC, Blue Hill Lane, Leeds, LS12 4NZ.

Team records

Fixtures and results

2015

2016

2017

2018

2019

2020

References

External links
Leeds Bobcats Official Website

American football teams in England
BAFA National League teams
2008 establishments in England
Sport in Leeds
American football teams established in 2008